Custom House Street Tower (also known as Customhouse Street Tower) is a proposed 42-storey  skyscraper in Cardiff, Wales. The building was originally due to open in 2018, however, as of 2020 work has yet to begin. The  mixed-use development building will accommodate approximately 450 students and also retail units on the ground floor. When completed it is envisaged that the tower will become the tallest building in Wales. The tower is enclosed by Custom House Street to the north, Bute Street to the east, the South Wales Main Line to the south and Hope Street to the west.

See also
List of tallest buildings in Cardiff

References

External links
Planning application

Residential skyscrapers in Wales
Buildings and structures under construction in the United Kingdom
Proposed buildings and structures in Wales